Codex Coislinianus designated by Hp or 015 (in the Gregory-Aland numbering), α 1022 (Soden), was named also as Codex Euthalianus. It is a Greek uncial manuscript of the Pauline epistles, dated palaeographically to the 6th century. The text is written stichometrically.
It has marginalia. The codex is known for its subscription at the end of the Epistle to Titus.

The manuscript was divided into several parts and was used as raw material for the production of new volumes. The codex came to the attention of scholars in the 18th century (after edition of Montfaucon). Currently it is housed in several European libraries, in: Paris, Athos, Saint Petersburg, Kiev, Moscow, and  Turin.

It is cited in all critical editions of the Greek New Testament.

Contents 
The surviving leaves of the codex contain:
 1 Cor. 10:22–29, 11:9–16;
 2 Cor. 4:2–7, 10:5–11:8, 11:12–12:4;
 Gal. 1:1–10, 2:9–17, 4:30–5:5;
 Col. 1:26–2:8, 2:20–3:11;
 1 Thes. 2:9–13, 4:5–11;
 1 Tim. 1:7–2:13, 3:7–13, 6:9–13;
 2 Tim. 2:1–9;
 Titus 1:1–3, 1:15–2:5, 3:13–15;
 Hebr. 1:3–8, 2:11–16, 3:13–18, 4:12–15, 10:1–7, 10:32–38, 12:10–15, 13:24–25.

All these books, belonging to the Pauline epistles, have survived only in fragments. Romans, Philippians, Ephesians, 2 Thes, and Phil have been lost altogether.

Description 
The codex originally contained the entire Pauline epistles. The leaves were arranged in quarto (four leaves in quire). Only 41 leaves of the codex have survived. The text is written on parchment in large, square uncials (over 1.5 cm), in one column per page, and 16 lines per page. The breathings (designated by ⊢ and ⊣) and accents were added by a later hand (not to the subscriptions). Accents often were put in wrong places. Iota subscriptum does not occur, there are some errors of itacism (f.e. ΙΟΔΑΙΟΙ instead of ΙΟΥΔΑΙΟΙ). The nomina sacra are written in an abbreviated way (ΘΥ, ΠΡΣ, ΧΥ, ΑΝΟΥΣ), the words at the end of the line are contracted.

The value of the codex is indicated by its subscription at the end of the Epistle to Titus: 
 Ἔγραψα καὶ ἐξεθέμην κατὰ δύναμιν στειχηρὸν τόδε τὸ τεῦχος Παύλου τοῦ ἀποστόλου πρὸς ἐγγραμμὸν καὶ εὐκατάλημπτον ἀνάγνωσιν… ἀντεβλήθη δὲ ἡ βίβλος πρὸς τὸ ἐν Καισαρίᾳ ἀντίγραφον τῆς βιβλιοθήκης τοῦ ἀγίου Παμφίλου χειρὶ γεγραμμένον αὑτοῦ.

I, Euthalius, wrote this volume of the Apostle Paul as carefully as possible in stichoi, so that it might be read with intelligence: the book was compared with the copy in the library at Caesarea, written by the hand of Pamphilus the saint.

Almost the same note appears in Codex Sinaiticus in the Book of Ezra and some Armenian manuscripts.

Text 

The Greek text of this codex is a representative of the Alexandrian text-type, but with a large number of Byzantine readings. According to Lagrange the text is similar to that of Codex Vaticanus. It is one of the witnesses for the Euthalian recension of the Pauline epistles.

According to Eberhard Nestle it is "one of the most valuable manuscripts". Kurt and Barbara Aland gave the following textual profile of it 71, 01/2, 122, 3s. This means the text of the codex agrees with the Byzantine standard text 7 times, it agrees 12 times with the original text against the Byzantine and that it has 3 independent or distinctive readings. Aland considered the quality of the text to suit his Category III. The corrections in the text are almost always representative of the Byzantine textual tradition.

The words before a bracket are the readings of Nestle-Aland, the words after a bracket are the readings of the codex 
 2 Cor — 10,7 ἀφ' ] ἐφ'
 2 Cor — 10,8 τε ] omit
 2 Cor — 11,1 ἀφροσύνης ] τη ἀφροσυνη
 2 Cor — 11,3 καὶ τἥς ἀγνοτητος ] omit
 2 Cor — 11,30 μου ] omit
 2 Cor — 12,3 χωρὶς ] εκτος
 Gal — 1,3 ἠμων καὶ κυρἰου ] και κυριου ημων
 Col — 1,27 ὅ ] ος

History 

The codex was probably written in the 6th century at the library in Caesarea, later coming into the possession of the monastery of the Great Lavra on Mount Athos, but its value appears to have been overlooked. Leaves of the codex were used as raw material for the production of new volumes. In 975 some leaves, now known as Fragmenta Mosquensia, were used to cover a volume of Gregory Nazianzen at Mount Athos. In the 12th century Fragmenta Taurinensia were used in Nicetas' catenae to the Psalterium, in 1218 another part, now named as Fragmenta Coisliniana, were used with the same purpose.

As a result, leaves of the codex were scattered in several places of the monastery, from where they were collected on several occasions by people from France, Russia, and Italy. The first was Pierre Séguier (1588–1672), who bought 14 leaves which, known later as Fragmenta Coisliniana, and became a part of the Fonds Coislin. They were held in Saint-Germain-des-Prés. In 1715 Bernard de Montfaucon published text of these 14 leaves. He made a few mistakes corrected by Tischendorf (in 1865). Tischendorf observed in Paris additional passage. Montfaucon used the manuscript for his palaeographical studies.

After the fire of St. Germain-des-Prés in 1793 only 12 leaves were found, the other two have been transferred to Saint Petersburg. From 1795 until the present it has been held by the Bibliothèque nationale de France. Fragmenta Mosquensia were brought to Moscow in 1665. They were examined by Matthaei. The last was Porphyrius Uspensky, who took one leaf from the monastery.

The codex is located in eight places, in seven libraries, in six cities in Europe. The bulk of the surviving leaves (22 leaves) are held in two collections in Paris, both in the National Library of France (Suppl. Gr. 1074, and Coislin 202). Eight leaves have not left the Great Lavra. Nine leaves are held in Ukraine or Russia, three each in Kiev (Vernadsky National Library of Ukraine), Saint Petersburg and Moscow (Hist. Mus. 563, and Russian State Library, Gr. 166,1). Finally, two leaves are held in Turin.

Henri Omont published the part of the codex known to him. Another part of the codex housed at Athos was published by Kirsopp Lake, in 1905. It is cited in the printed editions of the Greek New Testament since Tischendorf's edition.

The manuscript is cited in all critical editions of the Greek New Testament (UBS3, UBS4, NA26, NA27). In NA27 it belongs to the witnesses consistently cited of the first order.

See also 

 List of New Testament uncials
 Textual criticism

References

Further reading 
 Griesbach, J. J., Symbolae criticae ad supplendas et corrigendas variarum N. T. lectionum collectiones (Halle, 1793), pp. 85–87.
 
 
 Murphy, Harold S., "On the Text of Codices H and 93". Journal of Biblical Literature 78 (1959): 228–232, 235–237.
 Omont, M. H., Notice sur un très ancien manuscrit grec en onciales des Epîtres de Paul, conservé à la Bibliothèque Nationale. 1889. 
 Robinson, John A. T. Euthaliana, Texts and Studies. III. 3. Cambridge, 1895. Pages 34–43.

External links 
 Codex Coislinianus Hp (015) - at the Bibliothèque Nationale de France
 Codex Coislinianus Hp (015) — at the Encyclopedia of Textual Criticism, edited by Rich Elliott of Simon Greenleaf University.
 Image from Codex Coislinianus fol. 9v, contains 1 Tim 2:2-6
 015, Handschriftenliste, INTF
 015, LDAB.

Greek New Testament uncials
6th-century biblical manuscripts
Athos manuscripts
Fonds Coislin
Codex Coislinianus
Great Lavra